69: The Saga of Danny Hernandez is a 2020 true crime documentary film about Daniel Hernandez, a rapper, songwriter, social media personality, and convicted felon who is known professionally as 6ix9ine, or Tekashi69. The film details Hernandez's rise as a musician, as well as his gang affiliation and multiple arrests. It was directed by Vikram Gandhi and released on Hulu on November 16, 2020.

References

External links 
 
 

Hulu original programming
Hulu original films
2020 films
2020 documentary films
Documentary films about crime in the United States
Documentary films about hip hop music and musicians
American documentary films
2020s American films